is a former Japanese football player.

Playing career
Takagi was born in Edogawa, Tokyo on May 20, 1979. After dropped out from Kokushikan University, he joined J1 League club Verdy Kawasaki (later Tokyo Verdy) in 2000. Although he could not play at all in the match behind Kenji Honnami and Shinkichi Kikuchi until 2001, he battles with Daijiro Takakuwa for the goalkeeper position in 2002, he became a regular goalkeeper in summer 2002. The club won the champions 2004 Emperor's Cup. However the club was relegated to J2 League from 2006. The club won the 2nd place in 2007 and was promoted to J1 from 2008. However the club gained Yoichi Doi in 2008. Although Takagi played many matches as regular goalkeeper for a long time, he could hardly play in the match behind Doi from 2008. In 2009, he moved to J1 club Nagoya Grampus. However he could hardly play in the match behind Seigo Narazaki. In 2016, he moved to J2 club FC Gifu. He played many matches as regular goalkeeper in 2016. However he could not play at all in the match behind new member Víctor in 2017 and retired end of 2017 season.

Club statistics
Updated to 1 January 2018.

References

External links

1979 births
Living people
Kokushikan University alumni
Association football people from Tokyo
Japanese footballers
J1 League players
J2 League players
Tokyo Verdy players
Nagoya Grampus players
FC Gifu players
Association football goalkeepers